The sulphur-vented whistler or sulphur-bellied whistler (Pachycephala sulfuriventer) is a species of bird in the family Pachycephalidae. It is endemic to Sulawesi in Indonesia. Its natural habitats are subtropical or tropical moist lowland forest and subtropical or tropical moist montane forest.

Alternate names for the sulphur-vented whistler include the Celebes mountain whistler, Celebes whistler and yellow-vented whistler.

References

sulphur-vented whistler
Endemic birds of Sulawesi
sulphur-vented whistler
Taxonomy articles created by Polbot